Mandira dam is located near Kansbahal in Sundergarh district, Odisha, India. It is built across Sankh river, located 16 km upstream from Mandira. The water from the dam is used for Rourkela Steel Plant. Construction of the dam began after 1957. The dam displaced 2400 families and only 843 were resettled.

Tourism 
The reservoir offers boating facilities for tourists and the nearest railway station is located in Kansbahal on the Howrah-Mumbai main line of South Eastern Railway. Rourkela is the closest junction station. The dam can be reached from Kansbahal and Rourkela by two wheeler, private cars, taxis, auto rickshaws and irregular bus service.

References

External links
Mandira Dam in wikimapia

Dams in Odisha
Rourkela
Year of establishment missing